Set Catena is a crater chain (catena) located on Triton, the largest natural satellite of Neptune. It is named after the Egyptian god Set, the name being approved by the International Astronomical Union in 1991 and is located at 22°N, 33°30E. It is believed to possibly be the result of cryovolcanism.

See also 
 List of geological features on Triton

References 

Surface features of Neptune's moons
Triton (moon)
Set (deity)